Sarab-e Bayanchqolu (also Romanized as Sarāb-e Bāyenchoqlū and Sarāb-e Bāyenchqolū; also known as Sarāb-e Bāyenjeqlū and Sārūp) is a village in Hoseynabad-e Jonubi Rural District, in the Central District of Sanandaj County, Kurdistan Province, Iran. At the 2006 census, its population was 142, in 34 families. The village is populated by Kurds.

References 

Towns and villages in Sanandaj County
Kurdish settlements in Kurdistan Province